Le Rêve Transformé is a 1913 painting by the Italian metaphysical painter Giorgio de Chirico. This work contains the classic Chirico's images of an empty urban scene at late evening with a ghostly train on the horizon. In this case in the foreground is an arrangement of bananas, pineapples and a Greek sculpture.

1913 paintings
Paintings by Giorgio de Chirico
Trains in art